San Nicolò Gerrei, Pauli Gerrei in sardinian language, is a comune (municipality) in the Province of South Sardinia in the Italian region Sardinia, located about  northeast of Cagliari, in the Gerrei traditional subregion.

San Nicolò Gerrei borders the following municipalities: Armungia, Ballao, Dolianova, San Basilio, Sant'Andrea Frius, Silius, Villasalto.

See also 

 Pauli Gerrei trilingual inscription

References 

Cities and towns in Sardinia